Kõpu Parish was a rural municipality of Estonia, in Viljandi County. It had a population of 802 (as of 1 January 2009) and an area of 258.78 km².

Settlements

References

External links
Official website